The Pays-de-Monts national forest, also known as the Monts forest, is a French national forest stretching over the dunes of the northern Vendée coast.

Description
25 km long between Fromentine (municipality of La Barre-de-Monts) to the north and Sion-sur-l'Océan (municipality of Saint-Hilaire-de-Riez) to the south, its width does not exceed . It has a total area of  - La Barre-de-Monts alone totals  hectares, making it the largest forest area on the Vendée coast. It also impacts on the town planning of coastal municipalities such as those of Saint-Jean-de-Monts and Notre-Dame-de-Monts by  separating the waterfronts from their town centres with wooded avenues forming a "greenway" of a hundred meters width. Its altitude ranges from sea-level of the bordering coasts and marshes to a high point of 20m at the Pic de la Blet near La Barre-de-Monts.

History
The national forest of Pays-de-Monts was planted at the end of the 19th century under the Second Empire as part of a broader process of fixing the dunes and draining the marshes for cultivation.

Tree species
The predominant tree species of the forest is the maritime pine which covers 75% of the forest but is however now experiencing a real decline. Other tree species include Stone pine, Corsican Black pine (Pinus nigra var. corsicana), Holm oak, and Montpellier maple.

Environment
According to Natura 2000, the forest is part of a larger geographical framework also encompassing the marshes of the Marais Breton, the Bay of Bourgneuf, and the island of Noirmoutier.

This same geographical area was designated on February 2, 2017 as a Wetland of International Importance under the Ramsar Convention.

References

Forests of France
Geography of Vendée
Tourist attractions in Vendée
Natura 2000 in France
Ramsar sites in Metropolitan France